Alex Limoges (born March 7, 1995) is an American professional ice hockey center currently playing for the Manitoba Moose in the American Hockey League (AHL) while under contract to the Winnipeg Jets of the National Hockey League (NHL). He tied for the national lead in scoring while at Penn State in 2018–19.

Playing career
Limoges was a good scorer during his days in junior hockey and helped the Tri-City Storm win the Clark Cup in 2016. He began his college career in 2017 with Penn State and provided complimentary scoring as a freshman. While he couldn't stop the team from winning 7 fewer games than they had the year before, he did join the team for their appearance in the NCAA Tournament. For his sophomore season, Limoges came charging out of the gate and never looked back. Scoring in bunches throughout the season, he broke the program record for the most points in one year and ended up finishing in a tie for the national scoring lead. His exploits led the Nittany Lions to a 22-win season and put them in the Big Ten championship game. Due to the PairWise rankings, both Penn State and their opponent, Notre Dame, needed to win the game to reach the NCAA Tournament. Unfortunately for Limoges, he was held off the scoresheet and PSU fell 2–3.

As a upperclassman, Limoges was unable to continue the high-level of scoring and while he remained one of the team's top forwards, he was never again in contention for the national scoring crown. Despite his declining offensive production, Penn State finished atop the Big Ten in 2020 and were all but guaranteed a return to the NCAA Tournament. Their shot at a championship was wiped away when the COVID-19 pandemic forced the NCAA to cancel all winter and spring tournaments. The pandemic also forced the start of the following season to be delayed, but Limoges returned, this time serving as team captain. While he averages a point per game for the year, Limoges' team was not nearly as sharp as it had been over the previous three seasons and the Nittany Lions finished with a losing record for the first time since 2014.

After Penn State was eliminated from contention, Limoges signed a try-out contract with the San Diego Gulls for the remainder of the season and performed well at the AHL level. He resigned with the club for the 21–22 season.

As an undrafted free agent following a productive 2021–22 season in the AHL, Limoges was signed to a one-year, entry-level contract with the Winnipeg Jets on July 14, 2022.

Career statistics

Awards and honors

References

External links

1997 births
Living people
American men's ice hockey centers
Manitoba Moose players
Penn State Nittany Lions men's ice hockey players
San Diego Gulls (AHL) players
Tri-City Storm players
Ice hockey people from Virginia
People from Winchester, Virginia
Waterloo Black Hawks players